Vacationland was an automobile ferry that operated in Michigan's Straits of Mackinac between Mackinaw City and St. Ignace from 1952 to 1957, when the Mackinac Bridge was completed.

Vacationland was built in 1952 by Great Lakes Engineering Works in River Rouge, Michigan for the State of Michigan's Department of Highways at a cost of $4,745,000. She was designed by Prof. L. A. Baier of the University of Michigan's Marine Engineering Department, in conjunction with H. M. Varian, superintendent of Great Lakes Engineering Works.  The vessel was powered by 4  Nordberg direct-drive diesel engines, each connected to a propeller through a Westinghouse electro-magnetic coupling, generating a total of nearly 10,000 horsepower. Christened in 1951 by 14-year-old Barbara Ziegler, the daughter of Michigan's Highway Commissioner, Charles M. Ziegler, Vacationland was the last ship built for the Highway Department ferry operation. She was designed to carry 150 automobiles, to relieve heavy traffic congestion at the Straits during the summer season, and also to serve as an icebreaker during winter months to keep the route open all year.

Prior to Vacationlands arrival, starting in 1923, the Highway Department operated a fleet of coal-fired steamers, several of which were former railroad ferries, purchased second hand from Lake Michigan operators.  In winter months, to perform the icebreaking, the state had also chartered the railroad ferry, Sainte Marie (II), which had to land at separate docking facilities on each side of the Straits.

The autos were carried below on a fully enclosed car deck. She operated with a crew of 47 men, who worked three shifts throughout the year. Her captain for most of her Michigan service was Frank U. Nelson.

After the opening of the Mackinac Bridge in 1957, Vacationland was mothballed for three years before being sold. She made the last official Michigan State Ferry crossing of the Straits of Mackinac on November 1, 1957, with a VIP cruise as part of the bridge opening ceremonies. She also made the very last crossing for Michigan State Ferries on November 2, 1957, when a single "deadhead" round-trip run was made to take supplies from Mackinaw City to the state warehouse in St. Ignace. She then was returned for layup in her slip in Mackinaw City. The deadhead run was commanded by her Second Mate, Gerald Cronan, of St. Ignace, as all her other officers had already left to take other employment.

In 1960 she was sold to the Detroit Atlantic Navigation Company of Detroit, and was renamed Jack Dalton. That operation, carrying truck trailers between Detroit and Cleveland, was short-lived, and Michigan took her back for non-payment.

She was sold next to Canadian operators, Compagnie de Navigation Nord-Sud, (North-South Navigation Company) on the St. Lawrence River, where she operated between Pointe-au-Père (Rimouski) and Baie-Comeau from 1961 to 1966 as the Père Nouvel. As such, she was modified to include a cafeteria and bar/lounge in one observation room. The service inaugurated the first crossing of the eastern St. Lawrence River and was very popular.

In 1967 she was sold again to BC Ferries, of Victoria, British Columbia. They sailed the ship through the Panama Canal to Victoria and renamed the ferry as the Sunshine Coast Queen. The Suzy Q, as she was affectionately called, was modified to better fit BC landings, and increase passenger and vehicle capacity. A full service cafeteria replaced the snack bar and lounge installed in Quebec. She was assigned to the Horseshoe Bay (West Vancouver) to Langdale route across Howe Sound on the Sunshine Coast. She was BC Ferries first large double ended vessel.

Retired due to increasing traffic and high operating costs in 1977 after the first Arab oil embargo, she was again laid up. Sold to Canaarctic Ventures, the company planned to convert the ferry to an oil-drilling support ship on Alaska's North Slope as the Gulf Kanayak. The oil embargo ended, however, and the ferry remained laid up until 1987. That year, she was sold to Chenco, Inc, and was sent to scrap in Nantong, China.

The ship did not make it; the Gulf Kanayak sank while under tow of the Hoshin #8, in a Pacific storm on December 3, 1987.

See also
Ferries in Michigan

External links
History of the Vacationland
Vacationland Photo
Michigan State Ferry Album

Ferries of Michigan
Transportation in Cheboygan County, Michigan
Transportation in Mackinac County, Michigan
1951 ships
Ships built in River Rouge, Michigan